The Galiuro Mountains are a large sky island mountain range of southeast Arizona, United States. It is a northerly mountain range in the Madrean Sky Islands region of southeast Arizona, northern Sonora in northwestern Mexico, and the extreme southwest (the "bootheel") of New Mexico.

The range is noted for its height and ruggedness. The Aravaipa Canyon Wilderness encompasses the north perimeter of the range, and the large Galiuro Wilderness covers the central-south.  To the south, the Galiuro Wilderness borders the Redfield Canyon Wilderness. A river valley borders the range to the southwest, and Aravaipa Creek and Valley border its northeast.

Range overview
The Galiuro Mountains are a northwest–southeast trending range. The moderately wide San Pedro Valley and River border its southwest, abutting the northeast of the large sky island Santa Catalina Mountains range. The more narrow canyon northeast is the Aravaipa Valley with Aravaipa Creek.

Mammoth, Arizona, northeast of Tucson and San Manuel, are the closest communities to the range on its northwest.

Peaks and landforms

See also

 List of mountain ranges of Arizona

References

External links

 Arizona Mountain Ranges Highpoints
 Galiuro Mountains at mountainzone: Coordinates, Trails, (only accurate info)
 Visual Overview via Saguaro Juniper Corporation
 Bassett Peak, Arizona Peaks, 'Climber.Org'
 

Mountain ranges of Graham County, Arizona
Mountain ranges of Pinal County, Arizona
Madrean Sky Islands mountain ranges
Mountain ranges of Arizona